Thermarces is a genus of marine ray-finned fish belonging to the family Zoarcidae, the eelpouts. They are associated with hydrothermal vents and cold seeps at bathypelagic depths in the East Pacific and West Atlantic Ocean.

Species
The following species are classified within the genus Thermarces:

References

External links
 Thermarces at Encyclopedia of Life.

Lycodinae